The Cathedral of St. Joseph is the cathedral church of the Roman Catholic Diocese of Manchester in New Hampshire, United States. It is located at 145 Lowell Street in the downtown district. Bishop Peter Libasci serves as Bishop of the Diocese of Manchester, and Father Jason Jalbert is the rector of the cathedral parish.

History
The church was founded in 1869 to serve the needs of Irish immigrants. Pope Leo XIII established the Diocese of Manchester in 1884, and St. Joseph's parish became the cathedral that same year. The building has undergone several renovations and expansions since.

In 1968, the high altar, Stations of the Cross, and many other decorations were removed according to the fashion popular after the Second Vatican Council. The diocese began another renovation in 2014 to install similar pieces removed from Holy Trinity Church in Boston after it closed.

See also

List of Catholic cathedrals in the United States
List of cathedrals in the United States

References

External links

 St. Joseph Cathedral official site
 Roman Catholic Diocese of Manchester official site

Irish-American culture in New Hampshire
Joseph
Roman Catholic churches in Manchester, New Hampshire
Churches in Hillsborough County, New Hampshire
Tourist attractions in Manchester, New Hampshire
Cathedrals in New Hampshire
Religious organizations established in 1884
Roman Catholic churches completed in 1894
19th-century Roman Catholic church buildings in the United States